Roger Bruce Myerson (born March 29, 1951) is an American economist and professor at the University of Chicago. He holds the title of the David L. Pearson Distinguished Service Professor of Global Conflict Studies at The Pearson Institute for the Study and Resolution of Global Conflicts in the Harris School of Public Policy, the Griffin Department of Economics, and the college. Previously, he held the title The Glen A. Lloyd Distinguished Service Professor of Economics. In 2007, he was the winner of the Sveriges Riksbank Prize in Economic Sciences in Memory of Alfred Nobel with Leonid Hurwicz and Eric Maskin for "having laid the foundations of mechanism design theory." He was elected a Member of the American Philosophical Society in 2019.

Biography
Roger Myerson was born in 1951 in Boston. He attended Harvard University, where he received his A.B., summa cum laude, and S.M. in applied mathematics in 1973. He completed his  Ph.D. in applied mathematics from Harvard University in 1976. His doctorate thesis was A Theory of Cooperative Games.

From 1976 to 2001, Myerson was a professor of economics at Northwestern University's Kellogg School of Management, where he conducted much of his Nobel-winning research. From 1978 to 1979, he was visiting researcher at Bielefeld University. He was visiting professor of economics at the University of Chicago from 1985 to 1986 and from 2000 to 2001. He became professor of economics at Chicago in 2001. Currently, he is the inaugural David L. Pearson Distinguished Service Professor of Global Conflict Studies at the University of Chicago.

Awards and honors

Bank of Sweden Nobel Memorial Prize
Myerson was one of the three winners of the 2007 Nobel Memorial Prize in Economic Sciences, the other two being Leonid Hurwicz of the University of Minnesota, and Eric Maskin of the Institute for Advanced Study. He was awarded the prize for his contributions to mechanism design theory.

Myerson made a path-breaking contribution to mechanism design theory when he discovered a fundamental connection between the allocation to be implemented and the monetary transfers needed to induce informed agents to reveal their information truthfully. Mechanism design theory allows for people to distinguish situations in which markets work well from those in which they do not. The theory has helped economists identify efficient trading mechanisms, regulation schemes, and voting procedures. Today, the theory plays a central role in many areas of economics and parts of political science.

Memberships and honors
Myerson is a member of the American Academy of Arts and Sciences, the National Academy of Sciences, the Council on Foreign Relations, and the American Philosophical Society. He is a Fellow of the Game Theory Society and serves as an advisory board member on the International Journal of Game Theory.  Myerson holds an honorary doctorate from the University of Basel in 2002  and received the Jean-Jacques Laffont Prize in 2009. He also served on the Social Sciences jury for the Infosys Prize in 2016.

Personal life
In 1980, Myerson married Regina (née Weber) and the couple had two children, Daniel and Rebecca. His daughter, Rebecca, is a health economist at the University of Wisconsin-Madison.

Publications
Game theory and mechanism design
 
 
 
 
 
 
 
 "Bayesian Equilibrium and Incentive Compatibility," in 

He wrote a general textbook on game theory in 1991, and has also written on the history of game theory, including his review of the origins and significance of noncooperative game theory. He also served on the editorial board of the International Journal of Game Theory for ten years.

Myerson has worked on economic analysis of political institutions and written several major survey papers:
 
 "Economic Analysis of Political Institutions: An Introduction," Advances in Economic Theory and Econometrics: Theory and Applications, volume 1, edited by D. Kreps and K. Wallis (Cambridge University Press, 1997), pages 46–65.
 

 

His recent work on democratization has raised critical questions about American policy in occupied Iraq:
 

Books

Concepts named after him 
 Myerson–Satterthwaite theorem
 Myerson mechanism
 Myerson ironing

See also
 List of economists
 List of Jewish Nobel laureates

References

External links
  including the Nobel Lecture Perspectives on Mechanism Design in Economic Theory
 Webpage at the University of Chicago
 ABC News Chicago interview
 
 The scientific background to the 2007 Nobel prize: Mechanism Design Theory
 Myerson participated in panel discussion, The Global Economic Crisis: What Does It Mean for U.S. National Security? at the Pritzker Military Museum & Library on April 2, 2009

1951 births
Living people
Nobel laureates in Economics
American Nobel laureates
Economists from Massachusetts
20th-century American mathematicians
21st-century American mathematicians
Game theorists
Harvard School of Engineering and Applied Sciences alumni
Jewish American social scientists
Kellogg School of Management faculty
University of Chicago faculty
Writers from Boston
Presidents of the Econometric Society
20th-century American writers
21st-century American non-fiction writers
20th-century American economists
21st-century American economists
Fellows of the Econometric Society
Fellows of the American Academy of Arts and Sciences
Members of the United States National Academy of Sciences
Members of the American Philosophical Society
Nancy L. Schwartz Memorial Lecture speakers